Indian Oil Corporation Limited (IOCL; d/b/a IndianOil) is an Indian central public sector undertaking under the ownership of the Ministry of Petroleum and Natural Gas, Government of India. It is headquartered in New Delhi. It is a public sector undertaking whose operations are overseen by the Ministry of Petroleum and Natural Gas. Indian Oil is ranked 142nd on the Fortune Global 500 list of the world's biggest corporations as of 2022. It is the largest government owned oil producer in the country, with a net profit of $6.1 billion for the financial year 2020-21. As of 31 March 2021, Indian Oil's employee strength is 31,648, out of which 17,762 are executives and 13,876 non-executives, while 2,776 are women, comprising 8.77% of the total workforce.

Indian Oil's business interests overlap the entire hydrocarbon value chain, including refining, pipeline transportation, marketing of petroleum products, exploration and production of crude oil, natural gas and petrochemicals. Indian Oil has ventured into alternative energy and globalisation of downstream operations. It has subsidiaries in Sri Lanka (Lanka IOC), Mauritius (IndianOil (Mauritius) Ltd) and the Middle East (IOC Middle East FZE).

History
In May 2018, IOCL became India's most profitable government corporation for the second consecutive year, with a record profit of ₹21,346 crores in 2017–18. In February 2020, the company signed a deal with the Russian oil company Rosneft to buy 140,000 barrels per day of crude in year 2020. By 1 April 2020, IndianOil was in absolute readiness to launch BS-VI (Bharat Stage VI) fuels in all its retail outlets in Telangana and adopt world-class emission norms.

In January 2021, sales were registered at an all time high of 410,000 barrels of oil per day till 26 January 2021. Delek, QatarEnergy, Saudi Aramco are its largest business partners with Abu Dhabi National Oil Company and National Iranian Oil Company signing deals to deliver high production output at end of 2020

In March 2022, Apollo Hospitals replaced Indian Oil Corporation in Nifty 50 benchmark index

Operations

Business divisions 
There are seven major business divisions in the organization:
 Refineries Division
 Pipelines Division
 Marketing Division
 R&D Division
 Petrochemicals Division
 Exploration & Production (E&P) Division
 Explosives and Cryogenics Division

Products and services 

Indian Oil accounts for nearly half of India's petroleum products market share, 35% national refining capacity (together with its subsidiary Chennai Petroleum Corporation Ltd. or CPCL), and 71% downstream sector pipelines through capacity. The Indian Oil Group owns and operates 11 of India's 23  refineries with a combined refining capacity of 80.7 million tonnes per year. Indian Oil's cross-country pipeline network, for the transport of crude oil to refineries and finished products to high-demand centres, spans over 13,000 km. The company has a throughput capacity of 80.49 million tonnes per year for crude oil and petroleum products and 9.5 million cubic metres per day at standard conditions for gas. On 19 November 2017, IOCL, in collaboration with Ola, launched India's first electric charging station at one of its petrol-diesel stations in Nagpur. Indian governments' National Electric Mobility Mission Plan launched in 2013 aims at gradually ensuring a vehicle population of 6 to 8 million electric and hybrid vehicles in India by 2020.

Servo is the lubricants brand under which IOCL operates its lubricant business. Servo is the largest selling lubricant brand in both automotive and industrial segments.

It is said that deals with Royal Dutch Shell and Surgutneftegas and Chevron Corporation have been signed for exclusive business plans for supply in Asia with the Indian Oil Company, which are worth 20 billion dollars per year.

Refinery locations 

Barauni Refinery
Bongaigaon Refinery
CPCL, Chennai
CPCL, Narimanam
Digboi Refinery
Guwahati Refinery
Haldia Refinery
Koyali Refinery
Mathura Refinery
Panipat Refinery
Paradip Refinery

Pipelines 
Salaya - Mathura crude oil pipeline
Mundra - Panipat crude oil pipeline
Paradip-Haldia-Barauni crude oil pipeline
Kandla–Bhatinda Oil Pipeline
Koyali - Mohanpura product pipeline
Koyali - Ahmedabad product pipeline
Guwahati - Siliguri product pipeline
Barauni - Kanpur product pipeline
Haldia - Mourigram - Rajbandh product pipeline
Haldia - Barauni product pipeline
Panipat - Jalandhar LPG pipeline
Dadri - Panipat R-LNG pipeline
Koyali - Ratlam product pipeline
Koyali - Dahej/ Hazira product pipeline
Panipat - Bhatinda product pipeline
Panipat - Rewari product pipeline
Panipat - Ambala - Jalandhar product pipeline
Mathura - Delhi product pipeline
Mathura - Bharatpur product pipeline
Mathura - Tundla product pipeline
Chennai - Trichy - Madurai product pipeline
Chennai - Bangalore product pipeline
Chennai ATF pipeline
Bangalore ATF pipeline
Kolkata ATF pipeline
Paradip - Raipur - Ranchi product pipeline
Jaipur Panipat Naphtha Pipeline
Paradip - Hyderabad product pipeline
Paradip-Haldia-Durgapur LPG Pipeline
Paradip-Somnathpur-Haldia Product Pipeline

Foreign subsidiaries
Subsidiaries include: 
 IndianOil (Mauritius) Limited
 IOC Middle East FZE, UAE
Lanka IOC PLC, Sri Lanka 
IOC Sweden AB, Sweden
IOCL (USA) Inc., USA
IndOil Global B.V. Netherlands
IOCL Singapore Pte. Ltd.
Tisco is trying to establish same units of petroleum products.s_a7

Employees 

As of 31 March 2021, the company had 31,648 employees, out of which 2,775 were women (8.77%). Its workforce includes 17,762 executives and 13,886 non-executives. The attrition rate in Indian Oil is around 1.5%. The company spent ₹96.57 billion on employee benefits during the FY 2016–17.

Listing and shareholding 

Indian Oil's equity shares are listed on the Bombay Stock Exchange and National Stock Exchange of India.

As of September 2018, it was owned 51% by the Government of India (through the President of India), and 43% by other entities. The latter included corporate bodies (20%), ONGC (14%), LIC (6%), Foreign portfolio investors,(6%) Oil India Limited (5%) and Indian Mutual funds (4%).

This was similar to its shareholding in 2017. As of 31 December 2017, the Promoters Government of India held approx. 56.98% of the shares in Indian Oil Corporation. The public held the rest of the shares – 43.02%. This includes Mutual Fund Companies, Foreign Portfolio Investors, Financial Institutions/ Banks, Insurance Companies, Individual Shareholders and Trusts. IOCL's Market cap as of December 2022 was Rs. 1,10,075.05 crore.

Strategic partnerships

IOC Phinergy Pvt Ltd 
Indian Oil Corporation (IOC) buys a stake in Phinergy (Israel) for manufacturing, development, and sale of aluminum-air batteries (Al-Air batteries) for electric vehicles. This joint venture is ready to facilitate the development of  Al-Air technology by intending to set up a factory in India.

Competition 

Indian Oil Corporation has two major domestic competitors – Bharat Petroleum and Hindustan Petroleum – and both are state-controlled, like Indian Oil Corporation. Major private competitors include – Reliance Petroleum, Essar Oil and Shell.

Oil Industry Development Board 

Petroleum stocks have been transferred from the Indian Oil Corporation to the Oil Industry Development Board (OIDB). The OIDB then created the Indian Strategic Petroleum Reserves Ltd (ISPRL) to serve as the controlling government agency for the strategic reserve.

See also 

 List of companies of India
 List of largest companies by revenue
 List of corporations by market capitalization
 Make in India
 Forbes Global 2000
 Fortune India 500
Rajiv Gandhi Institute of Petroleum Technology
Indane (LPG)

References

External links 
 

 

 
Oil and gas companies of India
Government-owned companies of India
Companies based in Delhi
Non-renewable resource companies established in 1964
Indian companies established in 1964
NIFTY 50
National oil and gas companies
1964 establishments in Delhi
Companies listed on the National Stock Exchange of India
Companies listed on the Bombay Stock Exchange